

Great Britain
Bermuda – William Popple, Governor of Bermuda (1755–1763)
Gibraltar – 
The Earl of Home, Governor (1757–1761)
John Toovey, acting governor, April–June 1761
John Parslow, acting governor, June 1761
Edward Cornwallis, Governor (1761–1776)
Jamaica – William Lyttleton, Governor of Jamaica (1762–1766)
Province of Massachusetts Bay – Sir Francis Bernard, Governor (1760–1769)
New Jersey – 
 Thomas Boone, Governor of New Jersey (1760–1761)
 Josiah Hardy, Governor of New Jersey (1761–1763)
Province of New York – Cadwallader Colden, Acting Governor (1760–1762)
Province of South Carolina – 
 William Bull II, acting governor (1760–1761)
 Thomas Boone, Governor of South Carolina (1761–1764)

Portugal
 Angola – António de Vasconcelos, Governor of Angola (1758–1764)
 Macau –
 D. Diogo Pereira, Governor of Macau (1758–1761)
 Antonio de Mendonca Corte-Real, Governor of Macau (1761–1764)

Colonial governors
Colonial governors
1761